Kepirli is a village in the Mersin Province, Turkey. It's part of Toroslar district (which is an intracity district within Greater Mersin). It is situated in the southern slopes of the Toros Mountains to the north of the city center and on the road connecting Mersin to mountain villages. The population of Kepirli was 263  as of 2012. The population is composed of Yörüks (once nomadic Turkmens). The village overlooks Mersin and there are on-road restaurants for the passengers around the village .

References

Villages in Toroslar District